The 1999 Major League Soccer season was the fourth season of Major League Soccer. It was also the 87th season of FIFA-sanctioned soccer in the United States, and the 21st with a national first-division league. This was the last season which used the 35 yard line shootout rule to resolve tied games, and that of the countdown timer, with MLS Cup 1999 adopting the IFAB-standard running clock thereafter.

Stadiums and locations

Standings

Eastern Conference

Western Conference

Overall Table

MLS Cup Playoffs

Bracket

Best of Three series winner will advance.

Conference semifinals

Eastern Conference

D.C. United advance 2–0, to the Conference Finals.

Columbus Crew advance 2–0, to the Conference Finals.

Western Conference

Los Angeles Galaxy advance 2–0, to the Conference Finals.

Dallas Burn advance 2–1, to the Conference Finals.

Conference finals

D.C. United advance 2–1, advance to MLS Cup '99.

Los Angeles Galaxy advance 2–1. advance to MLS Cup '99.

MLS Cup

D.C. United and Los Angeles Galaxy earn MLS berths to 2000 CONCACAF Champions' Cup.

Player awards

Weekly awards

Monthly awards

End-of-season awards

Player statistics

Top Goal Scorers

International Competition

CONCACAF Champions' Cup

Chicago FireDefeated  Joe Public F.C. 2–0 (Quarterfinals).Lost  L.D. Alajuelense 5–4 PK, 1–1 draw (Semi-finals).Draw  D.C. United Third place match 2–2. (Third place shared)
D.C. UnitedDefeated  Olimpia 1–0 (Quarterfinals).Lost  Necaxa 3–1 (Semifinals).Draw  Chicago Fire Third place match 2–2. (Third place shared)

Attendance

Coaches

Eastern Conference
D.C. United: Thomas Rongen

Western Conference
Dallas Burn: Dave Dir
Kansas City Wiz: Ron Newman, Ken Fogarty and Bob Gansler
San Jose Clash: Brian Quinn

References

MLS Site

 
Major League Soccer seasons
1999 in American soccer leagues